The Sacco-Vanzetti Battalion was a military unit of the National Confederation of Labor (CNT) from Euskadi that acted on the Northern Front during the Spanish Civil War. It was No. 4 of the CNT Militias and No. 12 of Euzko Gudarostea.

History 
The Sacco-Vanzetti battalion, 4th of the battalions organized by the CNT in Euzkadi, was completed based on companies from Gipuzkoa and new ones organized in Bizkaia.

The battalion distinguished itself in December 1936, during the Battle of Legutiano, fighting for Cestafé and Nafarrate, and suffering no less than 150 casualties. It remained a little longer on the Otxandiano front. The Sacco-Vanzetti battalion then marched to the Udala area, fighting in the third decade of April for Karraskain, suffering heavy casualties that forced them to withdraw.

Later, the unit fought in Urrutxua, Bizkargi and, merged with the Durruti Battalion in Santander, during the Battle of Kolitza. The battalion disappeared with the fall of Santander.

References 

Confederación Nacional del Trabajo
Defunct anarchist militant groups
Left-wing militant groups in Spain
Military units and formations of the Spanish Civil War
Military units and formations established in 1936
Military units and formations disestablished in 1937
Confederal militias